Mason Gooding (born November 14, 1996) is an American actor. The son of actor Cuba Gooding Jr., he had a recurring role in the television series Ballers (2018) and a starring role in the teen drama series Love, Victor (2020–2022). He has also appeared in the film Booksmart (2019) and portrayed Chad Meeks-Martin in Scream (2022) and Scream VI (2023).

Early life and education
Gooding was born on November 14, 1996, in Los Angeles, California, to Sara (Kapfer) and Cuba Gooding Jr. He is the eldest of three children. His paternal grandfather was Cuba Gooding Sr., the former lead singer of R&B band, The Main Ingredient, and his uncle is actor Omar Gooding. His paternal great-grandfather was originally from Barbados.

Gooding attended Windward High School in California, where he played varsity football for four years. He graduated in 2015. During high school, his main interests were football and theater. He wanted to begin acting after his graduation, but decided to attend college after visiting his father on set in New York. He enrolled in New York University Tisch School of the Arts to study dramatic writing and psychology. He dropped out during his junior year in order to pursue acting full time.

Career
In 2017, while he was still in college, Gooding found a manager and an agent and started booking roles. He booked his first major acting role in the HBO's dramedy Ballers opposite Dwayne Johnson. In 2018, Gooding booked his first major film role in Booksmart directed by Olivia Wilde in her directorial debut. In 2019, Gooding was cast as Andrew in Love, Victor, the television spinoff of the 2018 film Love, Simon. Originally developed for Disney+, the series premiered on Hulu in 2020. While he played football in high school, Gooding had to learn how to play basketball for the role. Gooding also appeared in Netflix's Christmas themed romantic comedy Let It Snow later that year. In 2020, he began appearing in Freeform's sitcom, Everything's Gonna Be Okay. In September 2020, Gooding was cast as Chad Meeks-Martin in the fifth Scream film, which was directed by Matt Bettinelli-Olpin and Tyler Gillett. The film was released on January 14, 2022.

In late August, Gooding co-starred alongside Kesha and Chloe Bailey in the scripted podcast, Electric Easy, a musical neo-noir science fiction show set in a futuristic Los Angeles in which humans struggle to co-exist with robots, known as “electrics”. The show was created by Vanya Asher and executively produced by Kesha. The podcast premiered on August 30, 2021.
Gooding reprised his role of Chad Meeks-Martin in the film Scream VI, released on March 10, 2023.

Filmography

Film

Television

References

External links
 

1996 births
Living people
21st-century American male actors
African-American male actors
American male television actors
American people of Barbadian descent
American people of German descent
Male actors from Los Angeles
Tisch School of the Arts alumni